The West Branch is a  river located in eastern New Hampshire in the United States. It is the northern tributary of Ossipee Lake, part of the Saco River watershed leading to the Atlantic Ocean.

The West Branch begins at the outlet of Silver Lake in the southern corner of Madison, New Hampshire, and takes a winding course south towards Ossipee Lake. It forms the boundary between the towns of Freedom and Ossipee. The flat, sandy terrain through which the river flows is known as the West Branch Pine Barrens and is the site of a nature preserve owned and managed by The Nature Conservancy.

See also

List of rivers of New Hampshire

References

External links
West Branch Pine Barrens Preserve

Rivers of New Hampshire
Saco River
Rivers of Carroll County, New Hampshire